Philip Lloyd, D.D. (15 May 1729 – 31 May 1790) was an Anglican Dean in the eighteenth century.

Lloyd was born at Greenwich and was educated at Christ Church, Oxford, where he matriculated in 1746, graduating B.A. in 1750, M.A. in 1752, and B.D ad D.D. in 1763. He was Vicar of Piddletown until  1765 when he became Dean of Norwich, a post he held until his death in Norwich.

Notes

External links
 
 
 

1729 births
People from Greenwich
Alumni of Christ Church, Oxford
18th-century English Anglican priests
Deans of Norwich
1790 deaths